Puerto Rico Highway 63 (PR-63) originates at Highway 102 in Mayagüez and terminates 0.6 kilometers later at Puerto Rico Highway 2. It is named the William C. Dunscombe Avenue.

Major intersections

See also

 List of highways numbered 63

References

External links
 

063
Roads in Mayagüez, Puerto Rico